The Monday Night Cabal was a 'ginger group' of influential people set up in London by Leo Amery at the start of 1916 to discuss war policy. The nucleus of the group consisted of Lord Milner, George Carson, Geoffrey Dawson, Waldorf Astor and F. S. Oliver.  The group got together for Monday night dinners and to discuss politics.  Throughout 1916 their numbers and influence grew to include Minister of Munitions David Lloyd George, General Henry Wilson, Philip Kerr, and Mark Jameson.  It is thought that word of the Ginger Group reached Douglas Haig, prompting him to invite Lord Milner to France in November for an 8 day tour of the Western Front. It was through the Ginger Group that Times editor Geoffrey Dawson published a December 4, 1916 news story titled "Reconstruction" that set in motion events that caused Prime Minister H. H. Asquith to resign, signaling the rise of the Lloyd George Ministry.  Among the group's primary objectives was the formation of a small war cabinet within government to fight the war against the German Empire effectively.  This point was advanced by The Times as early as April 1915, so it is unknown if the Ginger Group, or one its predecessor elements (most likely Times editor Geoffrey Dawson) was responsible for the idea behind Lloyd George's decision to create a War Cabinet on the day he was appointed Prime Minister.  However, his surprise choice of Lord Milner as one of the War Cabinet's five members shows the influence of the ginger group on him.

Footnotes

References 
 Amery, Leo, My Political Life, Vol. II, War and Peace (1914-1929), London: Hutchinson, 1953
 Gollin, Alfred, Proconsul in Politics, London: Blond, 1964
 Marlowe, John, Milner: Apostle of Empire, London: Hamish Hamilton, 1976
 Hochschild, Adam, To End All Wars: A Story of Loyalty and Rebellion: 1914-1918, Boston: Houghton, 2011
 Stewart, A.T.Q., Edward Carson, Belfast: Blackstaff, 1981

External links 
 Internet Archive, Link (Please sign up to view original source material for Footnotes and References)

1916 establishments in the United Kingdom
Organizations established in 1916
United Kingdom in World War I
Organisations based in the United Kingdom
David Lloyd George
H. H. Asquith